Ohwia caudata, formerly placed in the genus Desmodium (as D. caudatum), is a deciduous nitrogen fixing plant in the family Fabaceae. It is found in India, China, Taiwan and other parts of Asia. It is related to Arthroclianthus, Nephrodesmus and Hanslia. The leaves and roots of the plant are used as an insecticide.

References

Desmodieae
Fabales of Asia